Suntec City is a major mixed-use development located in Marina Centre, a subzone of the Downtown Core in Singapore, which combines a shopping mall, office buildings, and a convention centre. Construction began on 18 January 1992 and was completed on 22 July 1997.

Design

Suntec City was designed by Tsao & McKown Architects with emphasis on Chinese feng shui. The five buildings and the convention center are arranged so that they look like a left hand when viewed aerially. The Fountain of Wealth appears like a golden ring in the palm of the hand. As the fountain is made of bronze, it is believed that the balance of metal and water paves the way for success. Further, the specially selected Chinese name, 新达, means "new achievement".

Areas

Suntec Singapore International Convention and Exhibition Centre

The Suntec Singapore International Convention and Exhibition Centre was officially opened on 30 August 1995, and was previously known as the Singapore International Convention and Exhibition Centre (SICEC). Its current name was adopted in 2004 as part of a rebranding exercise.

During the 2010 Summer Youth Olympics, the convention centre hosted the boxing, fencing, handball, judo, taekwondo, and wrestling competitions.

Suntec City Mall

The Suntec City Mall is a shopping centre located within Suntec City. It also offers a club house called the Suntec City Guild House located on the fifth storey.

The large mall boasts some 360 outlets spread over 4 floors in an L-shaped configuration. To help shoppers to navigate around the mall, it was divided into four zones, namely:

 The West Wing, located on the lower floors of the Suntec Singapore International Convention and Exhibition Centre, offering high-end international labels targeted specifically at convention delegates and tourists. It reopened in June 2013.
 The North Wing includes high end tenants, and alfresco dining outlets.
 The Fountain Terrace is located around the Fountain of Wealth, and specialises in food and beverage outlets.
 The East Wing at the north-eastern end of the mall is dedicated to entertainment, technology and lifestyle related tenants.

Suntec City hosted the countdown in 2016/17 from Channel 5 artistes.

Office towers

The office towers comprise five buildings named Towers One through Five with four containing 45 stories and one 18 stories. Tower One to Four is 45-storey representing the 4 fingers and Tower 5 is 18-storey representing the thumb.

Suntec City Office Towers houses a number of foreign diplomatic/non-diplomatic missions that are resident in Singapore. the Embassy of Spain on the 39th floor of Tower 1, Hong Kong Economic and Trade Office on the 34th floor of Tower 2, the Embassy of Rwanda on the 14th floor of Tower 3, he Embassy of Chile on the 24th floor of Tower 3, the Embassy of Qatar on the 41st floor of Tower 3, and the Taiwan Trade Center on the 9th floor of Tower 4.

Popularity
 The Urban Redevelopment Authority (URA) mentioned Suntec City as one of the largest commercial developments in Singapore.
 Suntec City was awarded two FIABCI Prix d' Excellence awards for excellence in all aspects of real estate development (Overall winner and Commercial / Retail winner) in 1999. Suntec has claimed other prizes, including the 1998 Tourism Award from the Singapore Tourism Board.
 Suntec City has been featured three times on The Amazing Race reality television show. Once on the US version Season 3 and twice on the Asian version in both Season 1 and Season 2.

See also
 Fountain of Wealth
 List of convention and exhibition centres

References

External links

 Asia's Convention City
 Singapore Exhibition Information

Buildings and structures completed in 1997
Downtown Core (Singapore)
Marina Centre
Skyscraper office buildings in Singapore
Shopping malls in Singapore
Convention centres in Singapore
1997 establishments in Singapore
20th-century architecture in Singapore